The  Baltimore Colts season was officially the 34th season for the team as a member club of the National Football League. The team moved from Dallas, where they had played as the Dallas Texans the season before. The Colts had a record of 3 wins and 9 losses and finished fifth in the Western Conference.

In January 1953, a Baltimore-based group led by Carroll Rosenbloom won the rights to a new Baltimore franchise. Rosenbloom was granted an NFL team, and awarded the holdings of the defunct Dallas Texans organization, the descendant of the last remaining Ohio League founding APFA member Dayton Triangles, who lasted only one season in Dallas. Amongst these assets and players were hall of famers Gino Marchetti and Art Donovan, the nucleus of the group of players that remained from the Texans and carried on the legacy of the original Triangles franchise. Despite these definitive connections through the years, what was, and is still recognized as the new team was named the Colts after the unrelated previous team that folded following the  season. The team kept the blue and white color scheme that the Triangles franchise had for much of its existence.

The 1953 Colts have the unusual distinction of having a losing record, despite having a league-leading 56 defensive takeaways. Baltimore had a winning record after five games, defeating neighbor Washington before a capacity crowd of over 34,000 at Memorial Stadium, then lost seven straight to finish the season.

In the season opener against the Chicago Bears on September 27, Colts' defensive back Bert Rechichar set an NFL record for the longest field goal  breaking the previous unofficial record of 55 yards (set by drop kick by Paddy Driscoll in ).

Offseason

Draft

Regular season

Schedule

Standings

See also 
History of the Indianapolis Colts
Indianapolis Colts seasons

References

Baltimore Colts
1953
Baltimore Colts